Henry Austine Ugochukwu (born May 17, 1992) is a Nigerian professional football player, who plays for Cascavel as forward.

Career statistics

References

External links

1992 births
Living people
Nigerian footballers
Campeonato Brasileiro Série B players
Londrina Esporte Clube players
Horizonte Futebol Clube players
Association football forwards